This is a list of public and private educational institutions in the Kollam district of Kerala, India.

Department of Higher Education Schools

Higher secondary schools under DHSE
There are numerous schools under the Department of Higher Secondary Education (DHSE). In Kerala the DHSE is run through the government of Kerala. Hence, it is classified as a public educational institution. This provides reasoning for the large quantity of government run schools included in the list below.   
 Govt. BHSS, Chavara
 Ayyankoyikkal HSS, Koivila P.O
 Govt. HSS, Karunagappally
 Govt. Model Boys HSS, thevally
 Govt. Boys HSS, Kottarakkara
 Govt. HSS, Kulasekharapuram
 Govt. HSS, Kuzhimathikad
 Govt. HSS, Vellamanal
 Govt. HSS, Bhoothakulam
 Govt. HSS, Punalur
 Govt. HSS, Valathungal
 Govt. HSS, Vayala
 Govt. HSS, Ottakkal
 Govt. HSS, Karukone
 Govt. HSS, West Kallada
 Govt. HSS, Vallikeezhu
 Govt. HSS, Panmanamanayil
 Govt. HSS, Anjalummoodu
 Govt. HSS, Mangad
 Govt. HSS, Kummil
 Govt. Fisheries HSS, Kuzhithura, Alappat
 Govt.  International HSS, Sooraanad
 Govt. MG HSS, Chadayamangalam
 Govt. HSS, Anchal West
 Govt. HSS, Sasthamkotta
 Govt. HSS, Pallimon
 Meenakshi Vilasom HSS, Peroor, Kollam
 Govt. VHSS, Pattazhi
 Mohammeden Govt. HSS, Edathara
 Govt. HSS, Kulathupuzha
 Govt. Model HSS, Vettikkavala
 Govt. Girls HSS, Thazhava
 Govt. HSS, Chathannoor, Kollam
 Govt. HSS, Puthur
 Govt. HSS, Thekkumbhagam, Paravur
 Guhanandapuram HSS, Chavara South
 Amrutha Sanskrit HSS, Parippally
 Milade Sherif HSS, Mynagappally
 Odanavattom Girls HSS, Odanavattom
 V V HSS, poredam
 S.N. HSS, chithara
 St. Gregorious HSS, Kottarakkara
 S.M HSS, Kottara
 S.M HSS, Patharam
 B.J.S.M Madathil HSS, Thazhava
 S.V HSS, Clappana
 St. Antony's HSS, Kanjirakode
 S.N.D.P.Y HSS, Neeravil
 M.S.M HSS, Chathinamkulam
 N.S.S HSS, Chathannoor
 S.N.S.M HSS, Elampalloor
 M.K.L.M. HSS, Kannanalloor
 CP HSS, Kuttikkadu
 Chempakassery HSS, Poothakulam
 Irumpanangadu HSS, Irumpanangadu
 Kristraj HSS, Kollam
 St. Stephen's HSS, Pathanapuram
 E V HSS, Neduvathur
 Dr CT Eapen Memorial HSS, Sasthamcotta
 Ezhippuram HSS, Parippalli
 Mayyanadu HSS, Mayyanadu
 Vimala Hridaya Girls HSS
 AKM HSS, Mailapur, Eravipuram
 Thadikad HSS, Thadikad, Anchal
 St. Goretti HSS, Punalur
 Poovathoor HSS, Kottarakkara
 St. Alosious HSS, Kollam
 N S S HSS, Prakkulam
 Sivaram N S S HSS, Karikode
 V.G.S.S Ambikodayam HSS, Kunnathoor East P.O
 HSS, for Boys, Punalur
 C V K M HSS, East Kallada
 K P M E M HSS, Cheriyavelinelloor
 M M HSS, Uppodu, East Kallada
 B V HSS, Karunagappally
 M M HSS, Nilamel
 T K M HSS, Karikkode
 Sree Narayana Trust HSS, Kollam
 S V R VHSS, Vendar
 C S I Vocational HS&HSS, for Deaf, Valakom
 St. Joseph's Convent HSS
St. Jude HSS, Alumoodu, Mukhathala
 St. Mary's HSS, Kizhakkekara
 Vellimon HSS, Vellimon
 VHSS, Manjappara
 John F Kennady M HSS, Karunagappally
 Lourd Matha HSS, Kovilthottam
 Nehru Memorial HSS, Kaithakuzhy
 Mount Carmel E M HSS, Mathilakom
 St. John`s HSS, Karuvelil, Ezhukone
 S D A HSS, Kottarakkara
 Sabarigiri Higher Secondary School Anchal
 Mount Tabore HSS, Pathanapuram
 R V HSS, Valakom
 T V T M HSS, Veliyam
 VHSS, Vayanakom
 M A E M HSS, Karikkodu
 Jawahar HSS, Ayur
 A K M V HSS, Thadikkadu, Anchal
 Govt. HSS, Koikkal
 T K D M Govt. VHSS, Kadappakada
 Govt. HSS, Peringalam
 Govt. HSS, Ashtamudy, Kundara
 Govt. VHSS, Punnala
 Govt. HSS, Chithara
 Govt. HSS, Muttara, Kottarakkara
 Govt. HSS, Nedungolam, Paravur
 Govt. HSS, Oachira
 Govt. HSS, Yeroor
 Govt. HSS, Thevannoor
 Govt. HSS, Thodiyoor
 Govt. HSS, Kulakkada, Kottarakkara
 Govt. HSS, Poruvazhy, Kunnathoor
 Govt. VHSS, Kadakkal
 Vakkanad Govt. HSS, Kottarakkara
 Govt. HSS, Perinad
 Govt.HSS, Anchal East
 Sadanandapuram Govt. HSS
 Govt. HSS, Quilon West
 S N Trust HSS, Chathannoor
 S N Trust HSS, Punalur
 Technical HSS, Chadayamangalam.
 D.V.V. HSS, Thalavoor, Pathanapuram
 St. Thomas HSS, Punalur
 M E S English Medium HSS, Panmanam
 Sreeniketan HSS, Chathannoor
 Sree Narayana E M HSS, Valiyakulangara, Oachira
 Vivekananda HSS, Changankulangara
 N.G.P.M. HSS,Venchempu, Punalur
 T C N M GHSS, Nedumpara 
 Govt.VHSS, Kottankulangara 
 G P VHSS, Perumkulam 
 Govt.A S HSS, Puthanthura 
 M G D HSS for Boys, Kundara 
 M A M HSS, Chengamanadu 
 M T D M HSS, Malur 
 K N N M VHSS, Pavithreswaram 
 Devi Vilasom VHSS, Thalavoor 
 M T HSS Valakam, Kottarakkara 
 M M HSS, Vilakkudy 
 Adichanalloor Panchayath HSS, Adichanalloor 
 H.K.M HSS, Kallukuzhi, Umayanalloor
 The King's School, Kottiyam

Institutions under Directorate of VHSE
Additionally, there are also various schools under directorate of the Vocational Higher Secondary Education (VHSE). This is a vocational education program and hence focuses more on preparing students for specific jobs in the workforce (11). This commonly includes trades or skilled labour. This category of education is also popular in Kollam as evidenced by the high quantity of institutions under VHSE.  
 Govt. VHSS for Boys, Kottarakkara
 Govt. VHSS, Anchal East
 Govt. VHSS, Punnala
 Govt. VHSS for Girls, Kottarakkara
 Govt. VHSS, Cheriazheekal
 Technical High School, Ezhukone
 Govt. VHSS, Muttara
 Govt. VHSS, Karunagappally
 Govt. VHSS for Boys
 Govt. VHSS, Kulakkada
 Govt. VHSS, Pattazhi
 Govt. VHSS, Kottankulangara
 Govt. VHSS, Chathanoor
 Govt. VHSS, Eravipuram
 Meenakshi Vilasom Govt. VHSS, Peroor
 Govt. VHSS, Kadakkal
 T.K.D.M Govt. VHSS, Uliyakovil
 Govt. VHSS for Girls, Valathungal
 Govt. VHSS, Achancoil
 Govt. RFTH School, Karunagapally
 Edamon VHSS, Edamon
 K.S.M VHSS, Edavattom
 St.John’s VHSS, Ummannoor
 St. George VHSS, Chowalloor, Edakkidom
 VHSS, Odanavattom
 Manjappara VHSS
 Jayajyothi VHSS, Poruvazhi, Ambalathumbhagam
 R VHSS, Valakom
 V VHSS, Ayathil
 Sri Vidyadiraja Memorial Model VHSS, Vendar
 B.J.S.M Madathil VHSS, Thazava
 Thadikkad VHSS, Thadikkad, Pathanapuram
 Matha VHSS, Vilakkumpara
 Vivekananda VHSS, Chadayamangalam, Poredam
 VHSS, Arkannur
 K.N Nair Memorial VHSS, Pavithreswaram
 T.E.M VHSS, Mylode
 Sivavilasam VHSS, Thamarakudy
 D.V VHSS, Thalavur, Kottarakkara
 A.K.M VHSS, Thadikad
 K.P.S.P.M VHSS, East Kallada
 V.S VHSS, Ezhukone
 I.G.M VHSS, Manjakkala
 J.E. Kennedy Memorial VHSS, Karunagappally
 A.P.P.M VHSS, Avaneeswaram
 D. VHSS, Mylom
 VHSS, Vellimon
 St.Michael VHSS Kumbalam, Mulavana
 Kuzhikkal Edavaka VHSS, Pavithreswaram, Karupinpuzha
 Vayanakom VHSS, Oachira
 NS VHSS, Valacode, Punalur
 SK VHSS, Thrikkannamangal, Kottarakkara

Schools affiliated to CBSE
The CBSE is the 'Central Board of Secondary Education' and is the most common board in India (13). The CBSE uses 2 exams which are the AISSE in year 10 and AISSCE in year 12. (13) 
 St.Mary's E M Public School, Uliyakovil, Kollam 
 Jawahar Navodaya Vidyalaya|Jawahar Navodaya Vidyalaya, Kottarakara
 Kendriya Vidyalaya
T.K.M. Centenary Public School
 Sree Gurudeva Central School
 Sree Narayana Public School|Sree Narayana Public School, Vadakevila
 Sree Narayana Trust Central School
 Sree Buddha Central School, Kurunagapally
 K.N.S.M Sree narayana Central school kadaikodu Edakkidom
 National Public school, Thazhuthala, Mukhathala P.O, Kollam
 Lake Ford School, Kavanad, Kollam
 St. Mary's Residential Central School, Kavanad, Kollam
 B R Memorial Central School, Chethady, Kollam - Thirumangalam Highway, Chengamanadu
 A P R M Central School, Kizhukkumbagam, Chithara P.O, Kollam
 Sreeniketan Central School, Chathannoor Karamcodu P.O, Kollam
 Siddhartha Central School Pallimon, Kollam
 Sabarigiri English School, Anchal
 St. John's School, Anchal
 Sree Narayana Central School, Nedungolam, Paravur
 St. George central School, Anchal, Kollam
 Nehru Memorial Model School, Kadakkal, Kollam
 Vimala Central School, Chathannoor, Kollam
 Toc H Residential Public School, Punalur, Kollam
 City Central School, Uliyakovil, Kollam 19
 T K M Centenary Public School, Kollam
 Sabarigiri School Punalur, Kollam
 Mar Baselios School Maruthamonpally, Pooyappally, Kollam
 The Oxford School, Thazhuthala, Umayannalloor P.O
 Chinmaya Vidyalaya, Chanthanathope, Kollam
 Amrita Vidyalayam, Puthiyakavu, Karunagappally
 Navdeep Public School, Vettilathazham, Decent Jn P.O
 Sree Narayana Central School, Karunagappally
 St. Gregorious Central School, Karunagappally
 Divine Public School, Puthoor
 Jawahar Navodaya Vidyalaya, Kottarakara
 Aiswarya Public School, Kalakkode, Paravur
 St.Jude.Central School, Mukhathala, Kollam
 Fathima Public School, Punalur
 St.Joseph International School, Chittumala, Kundara, Kollam.
 Woodlempark Public School, Chunda, Anchal. Kollam (www.woodlempark.com)
 St.Ann's English Medium School,Ayoor
 Trinity Lyceum, Nanthirickal, Kundara
 River De International School, Kulathupuzha
 Stratford Public School, Thevalakkara, Kollam
 Shantiniketan International School
 Nilamel, Kollam
 AG Public School
 Travancore Devaswom Board Central School, Vettikavala

Schools affiliated to ICSE 
The ICSE is the Indian Certificate of Secondary Education and is issued by the Council For The Indian School Certificate Examinations (CISCE). (13) 
 Trinity Lyceum School, Kollam
 Mount Carmel Convent Anglo-Indian Girls High School
 Infant Jesus Anglo Indian High School
 Seventh Day Adventist Higher Secondary Residential School, Karickom, Kottarakkara
 St. John's Residential School, Kundara
 St. Mary's Residential Central School, Pathanapuram
 Amrita Vidyalayam, Peroor
 Mount Carmel Convent Anglo-Indian Girls High School, Kollam
 Auxilium English Medium School, Kottiyam
 PreshithaMatha School, Mangad
 Vimala Hridaya ISC School, Vadakkevila
 Maria Agnes English Medium Convent School, Kureeppuzha
 St. Joseph's Convent School, Edamon, Punalur
 St. Vincent's Convent School, Perumpuzha
 St. Charles Borromeo Convent School, Chittayam
 St. Charles Borromeo Convent School, Kadakkal
 St. Joseph International Academy, Kundara
 Mary Giri Vidya Mandir, Punalur
 Holy Trinity Anglo Indian International School, Thevalakkara

Schools affiliated to IGCSE (Cambridge) 
These schools take examinations from Cambridge University. After completing the IGCSE students have a qualification that is recognised globally. (10)  
 The King's School, Kottiyam

Schools with residential facilities 
These schools allow students to board and essentially live at school. There are few of these in the Kollam district. (12) 
 Jawahar Navodaya Vidyalaya|Jawahar Navodaya Vidyalaya, Kottarakara
 The Oxford School, Thazhuthala, Umayannalloor P.O 
MGM residential public school. Kottarakkara kollam

References

External links
 The Oxford School Kollam. " Top CBSE School in Kollam"[Online] Available at https://oxfordkollam.edu.in/ 
 Upskilled, (2021). QUALIFICATIONS. [Online] Available at: https://www.upskilled.edu.au/faq/qualifications/vocational-education-versus-higher-education#:~:text=Vocational%20Education%20and%20Training%20(VET)%20qualifications%20have%20been%20developed%20with,skills%20in%20their%20existing%20career. [Accessed on 29 March 2021]
 Jamil, F. (2021). List of the Best Boarding Schools in India. Edunity, [Online] p1. Available at: https://uniformapp.in/blog/best-boarding-schools-in-india/ [Accessed on 8 April 2021] 
 Kaur, G. (2019). CBSE. Jagranjosh, [Online] p1. Available at: https://www.jagranjosh.com/articles/different-school-boards-in-india-1525780883-1#:~:text=The%20Central%20Board%20of%20Secondary,affiliated%20schools%20across%2021%20countries. [Accessed on 8 April 2021]

Schools in Kollam district
Kollam district